James Harrison "Truck" Hannah (June 5, 1889 – April 27, 1982) was a Major League Baseball catcher who also had a lengthy minor league career.

Hannah played three seasons with the New York Yankees (1918–1920). He had 173 career hits in 736 at bats. He also had five home runs.

He was the first Major League Baseball player born in North Dakota and would be the only one until 1930.

Hannah's minor league playing career extended from 1909, when he played for Tacoma of the Northwestern League, through 1940, when he played for Memphis of the Southern Association.

Hannah managed for seven seasons in the minor leagues, serving as player-manager of the Los Angeles Angels of the PCL during 1937-38-39. He is a member of the Pacific Coast League Hall of Fame.

Truck Hannah played himself in two Paramount films, Warming Up (1928), Paramount's first sound features (with music and sound effects only), and Fast Company (1929). He was the father of Helen Hannah Campbell (1916-2013), who was a chaperone for the Muskegon Lassies in the All-American Girls Professional Baseball League.

References

External links

Truck Hannah at SABR (Baseball BioProject)

1889 births
1982 deaths
People from Grand Forks County, North Dakota
Major League Baseball catchers
New York Yankees players
Tacoma Tigers players
Calgary Bronchos players
Butte Miners players
Chattanooga Lookouts players
Spokane Indians players
Sacramento Wolves players
Mission Wolves players
Salt Lake City Bees players
Vernon Tigers players
Portland Beavers players
Los Angeles Angels (minor league) managers
Los Angeles Angels (minor league) players
Memphis Chickasaws players
Portland Beavers managers
St. Paul Saints (AA) managers
Baseball players from North Dakota